The Tharu (Tharu: थारु) or Tharuhat languages are any of the Indo-Aryan languages spoken by the Tharu people of the Terai region in Nepal, and neighboring regions of Uttarakhand, Uttar Pradesh and Bihar in India.

Tharu languages are spoken in the Tharu community. This languages are similar to other neighboring languages. Tharu language is one of  the major language spoken in Nepal.

Although their own precise classification within Indo-Aryan remains uncertain, Tharu languages have superficial similarities with neighbouring languages such as  Kumaoni, Awadhi, Maithili, Bengali, Rajbanshi and Bhojpuri. The lexicon of certain Tharu households is indicative of an archaic, 'indigenous' substratum, potentially predating both Sino-Tibetan or Indo-Aryan settlement. Tharu languages appear to be transitional within the context of Indo-Aryan.

Chitwania Tharu is spoken by approximately 250,000 speakers east of the Gandaki River, in and around the Chitwan Valley. Chitwania, as a whole, has superficial similarities with Awadhi. Nevertheless, certain Chitwania variants appear to have considerable lexical similarities with Manchad, a Sino-Tibetan language.

Dangaura, Rana, and Buksa refer to a triumvirate of mutually-intelligible Tharu variants spoken west of the Gandaki River, spoken by approximately 1.3 million people. Furthermore, an additional variant of Tharu, known as Sonha, is largely mutually intelligible with Dangauru.

Kochila, a diverse Tharu variant, is also spoken by approximately 250,000 people, in regions of eastern Nepal. Kochila Tharu communities are not found in isolation, but live in districts intermixed with speakers of other languages. “In contrast with western Terai where the Tharus are the only and dominant ethnic minority, the eastern – especially the far eastern – Terai is inhabited by several ethnic groups with very different linguistic affiliation”. Many ethnic Kochila have adopted Maithili.

Phonology 
The following consists mostly of the Daungara and Rana dialects:

Consonants 

  can be heard as a palatal  when preceding a palatal affricate.
 /, / may be in free variation with trill sounds [, ] in the Rana dialect.
 Palato-alveolar affricate sounds /, / are heard as alveolar affricate sounds [, ] in the Rana dialect.

Vowels 

 Nasalization also occurs as /, /.
 Vowels /, / are heard as [, ] when in lax form.
  is heard as  when preceding or following velar or glottal consonants.
  can be heard as  when following  or as  when following .

References

Eastern Indo-Aryan languages
Languages of Nepal
Endangered languages of India
Languages of Bagmati Province
Languages of Koshi Province
Languages of Madhesh Province